Stuarts Draft High School is in the community of Stuarts Draft in southeastern Augusta County, Virginia.  The school opened in 1970 during a consolidation period for the county's public schools.  Stuarts Draft High School originally served grades 8 through 12, and housed the 7th grade due to overcrowding at Stuarts Draft Elementary School (now Guy K. Stump Elementary School).  Today, Stuart Draft High School serves 720 students in grades 9 to 12.

A middle and elementary school have been built in proximity to Stuarts Draft High School, creating one of two school complexes in the county.  Seven percent of the student body is African American and one percent is Hispanic. Eleven percent of the students receive special education services. Stuarts Draft High School performs respectably on standardized tests. The school maintains an 87% pass rate on SOL end-of-course tests; the  mean SAT verbal and math score is 509 and 523 respectively. Sixty-three percent of Stuarts Draft seniors attend college; of that number, 35% go to four-year institutions.

References

Public high schools in Virginia
Educational institutions established in 1970
Schools in Augusta County, Virginia